Tupinambá may refer to:

Tupinambá people
Tupinambá language

Language and nationality disambiguation pages